Mark Knowles and Daniel Nestor were the defending champions, but did not participate this year.

Hugo Armando and Xavier Malisse won in the final 6–3, 6–7(4–7), [10–5], against James Auckland and Stephen Huss.

Seeds

Draw

Draw

External links
Draw

Doubles
2007 ATP Tour